Irving Jahir Saladino Aranda (born January 23, 1983) is a Panamanian former long jumper. He was Olympic champion, having won at the 2008 Beijing Olympics, and is Panama's first and only Olympic gold medalist. He was world champion in the long jump in 2007. He represented his country at three straight Olympics, from 2004 to 2012, and competed at four World Championships in Athletics from 2005 to 2011.

Amongst his honours are a silver medal from the 2006 IAAF World Indoor Championships and gold medals at the Pan American Games, Central American and Caribbean Games, Central American Games, South American Games, the IAAF World Cup and the Ibero-American Championships in Athletics. He ranks in the all-time top ten for the event. He had the longest jumps in the world in the 2006 and 2008 seasons.

Biography
Saladino was born in Colón, Colón Province, Panama. At the 2006 IAAF World Indoor Championships he finished second with a new South American indoor record of 8.29 metres. In 2006 he won five (Oslo, Rome, Zurich, Brussels, Berlin) out of six Golden League events in the same season, which earned him a total of $83,333. His only defeat was in Paris where he was second. With 8.56 metres achieved in May 2006 he became the South American record holder.

The 2006 world leader in the long jump, Saladino launched his 2007 season with the farthest leap of the year, 8.53 m (−0.2 m/s wind), to capture the victory at the "Grande Prêmio Rio Caixa de Atletismo", held in Rio de Janeiro on May 13, 2007. On 24 May 2008, Saladino achieved a new personal record. During the FBK Games in Hengelo, Saladino jumped with his first attempt to 8.73 m (+1.2 m/s wind).

He carried the flag for his native country at the opening ceremony of the 2007 Pan American Games in Rio de Janeiro, Brazil. On 30 August 2007 Saladino became the World Champion in Osaka. He led with the mark of 8.30 metres from his second attempt, then improved to 8.46 m, until the penultimate jump of the contest, when he was overtaken by Andrew Howe who set as mark 8.47 m. Saladino was able to earn the gold medal on the last attempt of the contest, in which he jumped 8.57 m.

Saladino competed at the 2008 Summer Olympics in Beijing, China, where he made history in Central America and his country, Panama, by winning the gold medal in the long jump competition on 18 August 2008, with a jump of 8.34 meters, giving Panama their first Olympic medal since the 1948 Summer Olympics, and their first gold ever. This is also the first Olympic gold medal ever won in a men's event by an athlete from Central America.

On 21 August 2008 after winning Olympic gold, he arrived to Panama a national hero. Government offices and public schools were closed in honor of him. At a welcoming ceremony, Panamanian boxing legend Roberto Durán presented the Olympic gold medal to Irving Saladino for a second time. Martin Torrijos, President of Panama, announced a decree to name a sports facility in the Villa Deportiva in Juan Díaz after Saladino and granted a check to him for 50,000  U.S. dollars. Also, Ruben Blades performed the song "Patria" (Motherland) in front of thousands of cheering Panamanians.

Saladino qualified for the 2012 Summer Olympics and he was chosen to be Panama's flag bearer. He was eliminated early after underperforming due to injury.

Saladino's performances declined after the 2011, and although he managed to clear  in the 2014 season, he announced his retirement that August.

Personal bests
Long jump: 8.73 m (wind: +1.2 m/s) – Hengelo, Netherlands, 24 May 2008
Triple jump: 14.51 m – San José, Costa Rica, 11 October 2002

International competitions

References

External links
 
 

1983 births
Living people
Sportspeople from Colón, Panama
Panamanian male long jumpers
Olympic athletes of Panama
Olympic gold medalists for Panama
Athletes (track and field) at the 2004 Summer Olympics
Athletes (track and field) at the 2008 Summer Olympics
Athletes (track and field) at the 2012 Summer Olympics
Medalists at the 2008 Summer Olympics
Pan American Games gold medalists for Panama
Pan American Games medalists in athletics (track and field)
Athletes (track and field) at the 2007 Pan American Games
World Athletics Championships athletes for Panama
World Athletics Championships medalists
Olympic gold medalists in athletics (track and field)
Central American and Caribbean Games gold medalists for Panama
IAAF Golden League winners
South American Games gold medalists for Panama
South American Games medalists in athletics
Central American Games gold medalists for Panama
Central American Games medalists in athletics
Competitors at the 2014 South American Games
Competitors at the 2006 Central American and Caribbean Games
World Athletics Championships winners
Central American and Caribbean Games medalists in athletics
Medalists at the 2007 Pan American Games